Stewart Malcolm McDonald (born 24 August 1986) is a Scottish National Party (SNP) politician. He has been the Member of Parliament (MP) for the Glasgow South constituency since May 2015. He was the SNP Spokesperson for Defence from 2017 to 2022, resigning after the election of Stephen Flynn as Leader.

Early life and education

Born in Castlemilk, Glasgow, McDonald's family moved to Govan when he was five years old, as his father was a janitor at a local primary school. He left Govan High School aged eighteen, and worked in a variety of jobs including as a retail manager and a holiday rep in Tenerife before becoming a parliamentary case worker for Anne McLaughlin MSP. After the 2011 Scottish Parliament Elections, he became a case worker for James Dornan MSP.

Political career
McDonald was selected unopposed as the SNP candidate for the Glasgow South constituency in October 2014. At the 2015 UK general election, he was elected with 54.9% of the vote, defeating the Labour incumbent Tom Harris during an SNP landslide across Scotland. His total represented the largest number of actual SNP votes in the city, and the largest majority.

In December 2015, McDonald came second place in the Beard Liberation Front's Parliamentary Beard of the Year Award. He was reported to have come very close to winning first place, but was narrowly defeated by Labour leader Jeremy Corbyn after Labour MP Diane Abbott urged people on Twitter to vote for Corbyn in the contest.

McDonald retained his seat in the 2017 snap general election with a decreased majority.

In July 2017 McDonald introduced a Private Members' Bill to ban unpaid trial shifts for workers. He called the practice "exploitation" for young job-seekers, and his Bill gained the support of the Scottish Trades Union Congress and the National Union of Students among others. In March 2018 the Bill was talked out of the Commons, meaning it could not be voted on. A year on from when he first introduced the Bill, he vowed to "keep fighting" to end unpaid trial work.

On 11 April 2018, as the SNP's Defence Spokesperson, McDonald warned Prime Minister Theresa May over launching airstrikes on Syria in response to the Douma chemical attack without first having the airstrikes approved by a parliamentary vote. He said the SNP would support such airstrikes if they were part of a wider plan to bring an end to the war. The UK launched airstrikes on 14 April without a parliamentary vote, which McDonald condemned as "gesture bombing".

At the 2019 general election, McDonald was re-elected with an increased majority of 9,005 votes.

Views
McDonald has been a long-time supporter of transgender rights, and reforming the Gender Recognition Act (GRA) in Scotland to make it easier for people to self-identify. He has stated that "I've always stood up for trans rights and I always will - there’s no chance I'll desert a community that’s integral to our wider movement for equality.". He has also condemned transphobia within the SNP on various occasions, and declared his support for First Minister Nicola Sturgeon when some SNP groups objected to her support of reforming the GRA.

He supports pre-exposure prophylaxis (PrEP) for HIV prevention to be available on the NHS. He has said that those opposing PrEP's introduction to the NHS were being homophobic, and has accused the UK government of "putting more hurdles in the way of the rollout of PrEP."

Like most of the SNP, McDonald is also a passionate advocate of unilateral nuclear disarmament, stating that "Opposition to nuclear weapons is fundamental to the Scottish independence movement", and has repeatedly called for cooperation with the Labour Party for the purposes of dismantling the Trident nuclear system.

He has also called for far greater action to be taken in relation to climate change, saying that "In Westminster, MPs have followed the lead of the First Minister and declared a Climate Emergency. We must now ensure this is followed up with real action.", and has praised the climate targets of the Scottish Government.

McDonald is a member of the Inter-Parliamentary Alliance on China. In September 2021, McDonald said he was troubled by Scotland's relationship with China, which he claimed "opened the doorway to misinformation from Beijing". He also claimed Russia has a history of disinformation running in Scotland and reported the show run by Alex Salmond (The Alex Salmond Show) on RT "lends credibility and legitimacy to Kremlin propaganda".

He supports an independent Scotland becoming a member of NATO, which is a position of debate within the SNP.

McDonald is a republican and has called for a debate over the existence of the British monarchy in an independent Scotland.

Electoral history

Personal life 

McDonald is openly gay and, on 19 May 2015, gathered with other LGBT SNP MPs, including his near-namesake Stuart McDonald, to campaign for a "Yes" vote in the Irish referendum on same-sex marriage, being held three days later. He is also an honorary associate of the National Secular Society.

Honours and awards 

  2019: Third Class of the Order of Merit of Ukraine

References

External links 

 SNP profile
 

1986 births
Living people
Gay politicians
LGBT members of the Parliament of the United Kingdom
Scottish LGBT politicians
Scottish republicans
Members of the Parliament of the United Kingdom for Glasgow constituencies
People educated at Govan High School
Politicians from Glasgow
Recipients of the Order of Merit (Ukraine), 3rd class
Scottish National Party MPs
UK MPs 2015–2017
UK MPs 2017–2019
UK MPs 2019–present